José Germain Drouilly (Paris, 1884-1964), more commonly writing under the name José Germain, was a French writer. Some of his works were turned into Silent era film scripts, such as The Magnificent Flirt (1928), from the novel Maman.

Works
More than 200 works are listed in the Bibliothèque nationale de France, some of them under the name (Jean-)Germain Drouilly, others under the name of Lieutenant D., among which:
 À bas les calottes, Paris, A. Lesot, 1911.
 Notre guerre, Paris, Renaissance du livre, 1918.
 Notre France en guerre, Paris, Hachette, 1919.
 Nos marins en guerre, Paris, Berger-Levrault, 1919.
 Rosa Berghem, Paris, Albin Michel, 1921.
 Danseront-elles ? Enquête sur les danses modernes, Paris, Povolozki, 1921.
 Un fils de France, Paris, Plon, 1922.
 Le général Laperrine, grand saharien, Paris, Plon, 1922.
 Le Sosie, Paris, Albin Michel, 1922.
 Pour Genièvre, Paris, Ferenczi, 1923.
 La seconde jeunesse, Paris, Ed. du Monde Nouveau, 1924.
 Le nouveau monde français, Paris, Plon, 1924. 
 Le Roi des rosiers, Paris, Ferenczi, 1925.
 Oh! Qu'elle était belle (sous l'Empire), Paris, Les pamphlets du Capitole, 1926.
 L'étreinte des races, Paris, Baudinière, 1928.
 Le Syndicalisme de l'intelligence, Paris, Librairie Valois, 1928.
 La touchante histoire de Geneviève de Brabant, Elbeuf, 1928.
 Femme, Paris, Baudinière, 1929.
 La danse de folie, Paris, Ed. Cosmopolites, 1930.
 Une heure de musique avec les chansons de guerre, Paris, Ed. Cosmopolites, 1930. 
 Les yeux de l'âme, Monaco, Société de Conférences, 1930.
 Bretagne en France et l'union de 1532, Paris, Tallandier, 1931.
 La Cormorandière, Ed. des Portiques, 1932.
 Minuit. Histoire de vingt-sept nuits, Paris, Tallandier, 1932.
 L'Amour mathématique, Paris, Tallandier, 1932.
 Ma Poupette chérie, Paris, Ferenczi, 1933.
 Seule parmi les hommes, Paris, Tallandier, 1933.
 Les Enfants perdus, Paris, Albin Michel, 1936.
 Le roman d'Anet ou les amours de Diane de Poitiers, Paris, Les Editions nationales, 1936.
 Trésor des héros, Paris, Spes, 1937.
 Héros d'un jour, Paris, Spes, 1939.
 Notre chef Pétain, Paris, Technique du livre, 1941.
 Héros de France, Paris, Éditions de France, 1942.
 Mes Catastrophes, Paris, La Couronne littéraire, 1948, dédicacé au général René Chambe.
 La première leçon d'amour, Paris, La Couronne littéraire, 1948.
 Première leçon d'amour, Paris, La Couronne littéraire, 1950.
 Sappho de Lesbos, Paris, Deux rives, 1954.
 Richemont, compagnon de Jeanne d'Arc, Paris, Pierre Amiot, 1957.
 Le théâtre des familles, Paris, Albin Michel, 1961.
 L'Amour aux étapes, Paris, Renaissance du Livre, s.d.
 La Flotte rouge, Paris, Baudinière, s.d.

References

1884 births
1964 deaths
French male writers
20th-century French male writers